First and Foremost is a compilation album of songs by Australian singer David Campbell. The album was released in August 2008 and contains tracks from his earlier Polydor Records recordings from 1996 and 1997, alongside a previously unreleased song from that time. Most of the tracks appeared on his albums, Yesterday Is Now and Taking the Wheel.

The album was released during Campbell's time as a singing mentor on It Takes Two (Australian TV series) (2007-2008) and with his two previous albums (released by Sony Music Australia), both being top 10, platinum selling albums.

Track listing
 CD/DD 
 "On Such a Night as This" (Marshall Barer, Hugh Martin)- 2:39
 "Grateful" (John Bucchino) - 4:38
 "Whatever Happened to Melody" (Ray Jessel, Cynthia Thompson)- 3:25
 "Come Rain or Come Shine" (Harold Arlen, Johnny Mercer)- 5:01
 "Old Devil Moon" (Burton Lane, Yip Harburg) - 3:12
 "Alexander's Ragtime Band" (Irving Berlin) - 3"08
 "Let Me Sing And I'm Happy" - 2:16
 "I Got Rhythm" (George Gershwin & Ira Gershwin) - 2:38
 "The Nearness Of You" / "Not A Day Goes By" (Hoagy Carmichael, Ned Washington, Stephen Sondheim) - 5:06
 "Storybook" (Frank Wildhorn, Nan Knighton) - 3:10
 "Yard Sale" (Tom Andersen) - 5:43
 "Errol Flynn" (Gordon Hunt, Amanda McBroom)- 3:38
 "Mr Tanner" (Harry Chapin) - 5:06
 "I Have Dreamed" (Oscar Hammerstein, Richard Rodgers) - 3:57
 "Only Heaven Knows" (Alex Harding) - 3:13
 "Taking The Wheel" (John Bucchino) - 3:54
 "A Kid Inside" (Craig Carnelia) - 3:35
 "It Will Always Be You"  (Acoustic Version)  4:43

Charts

Release history

References

2008 compilation albums
Covers albums
David Campbell (Australian musician) albums
Universal Music Australia albums